is a private university in Nagahama, Shiga, Japan, established in 2003.

External links
Official website 

Educational institutions established in 2003
Private universities and colleges in Japan
Universities and colleges in Shiga Prefecture
2003 establishments in Japan
Nagahama, Shiga